Wilhelmus "Wim" Gerardus Rijsbergen (born 18 January 1952) is a Dutch football manager and former player who played as a defender. He was last the manager of Solomon Islands' national team.

Playing career
Rijsbergen was born in Leiden, South Holland. Playing for Feyenoord Rotterdam, he was part of the Netherlands national football team which finished second in both the 1974 and 1978 World Cups. He later played in the North American Soccer League, for the New York Cosmos. Rijsbergen began his professional career at PEC Zwolle, and ended it in 1986 at FC Utrecht.

Managerial career

In 1999, he was appointed manager of Universidad Católica.

Rijsbergen, an assistant to Leo Beenhakker at the 2006 World Cup in Germany, assumed control of the Trinidad and Tobago national team in his own right following the World Cup. As of December 2007, he was suspended by the Trinidad and Tobago Football Federation for six (6) months, through 4 June 2007 and replaced.

He was manager of Indonesia from 2011 to 2012, after which he stayed in Indonesia to become technical director. Rijsbergen joined the Solomon Islands and guided the island nation to a fourth place in group B in the 2019 Pacific Games.

Managerial statistics

Honors

As a player
PEC Zwolle
Tweede Divisie runner up: 1970–71

Feyenoord
Eredivisie: 1973–74
UEFA Cup: 1973–74

New York Cosmos
 Soccer Bowl: 1980, 1982
 Soccer Bowl runner up: 1981

Utrecht
 KNVB Cup: 1984–85

Netherlands
 FIFA World Cup runner-up: 1974, 1978
 UEFA European Championship third place: 1976

As a manager
FC Volendam
 KNVB Cup runner up: 1994–95

References

External links

 NASL stats
 

1952 births
Living people
Dutch football managers
Dutch footballers
Eredivisie players
Ligue 1 players
Association football defenders
Netherlands international footballers
North American Soccer League (1968–1984) players
New York Cosmos players
Footballers from Leiden
1974 FIFA World Cup players
UEFA Euro 1976 players
1978 FIFA World Cup players
Feyenoord players
FC Utrecht players
Helmond Sport players
PEC Zwolle players
SC Bastia players
Club Deportivo Universidad Católica managers
Dutch expatriate footballers
Dutch expatriate sportspeople in Chile
Dutch expatriate sportspeople in France
Dutch expatriate sportspeople in Indonesia
Dutch expatriate sportspeople in Trinidad and Tobago
Dutch expatriate sportspeople in the United States
Dutch expatriate football managers
Expatriate footballers in France
Expatriate football managers in Indonesia
Expatriate soccer players in the United States
Expatriate football managers in Chile
Trinidad and Tobago national football team managers
PSM Makassar managers
FC Groningen managers
NAC Breda managers
Indonesia national football team managers
UEFA Cup winning players